Larry Francis Abdel Azouni (born 23 March 1994) is a Tunisian professional footballer who plays as a midfielder for Club Africain. Born in France, he opted to represent Tunisia internationally.

Club career
Azouni made his professional debut on 6 December 2012 in the 2012–13 Europa League campaign against Cypriot side AEL Limassol in a 3–0 loss. He came on as a substitute for Kassim Abdallah in the 74th minute.

International career
Azouni was born and raised in France, to parents of Tunisian-Jewish descent. He played for various France youth teams, before switching to the Tunisia national football team. He made one appearance for the Tunisia U21 team. He made his debut for the senior Tunisia team in a 1–0 2017 Africa Cup of Nations qualification win over Togo as a sub in the 89th minute.

Career statistics

Club

International

References

External links
 
 
 

1994 births
Living people
Footballers from Marseille
Association football midfielders
Citizens of Tunisia through descent
Tunisian footballers
Tunisia international footballers
Tunisian expatriate footballers
French footballers
France youth international footballers
French sportspeople of Tunisian descent
Olympique de Marseille players
FC Lorient players
Nîmes Olympique players
K.V. Kortrijk players
C.D. Nacional players
Club Africain players
Ligue 1 players
Ligue 2 players
Belgian Pro League players
Primeira Liga players
2017 Africa Cup of Nations players
Expatriate footballers in Belgium
Expatriate footballers in Portugal